Shangri-La is the fifth album by Portland, Oregon-based musician Yacht (Jona Bechtolt), released on June 21, 2011. It is a concept album about utopia. This is Yacht's second album to include Claire L. Evans.

Track listing

References

2011 albums
Yacht (band) albums
DFA Records albums
Concept albums